Robert B. Kamm (January 22, 1919 – October 10, 2008) served as the 13th president of Oklahoma State University–Stillwater from July 1, 1966 to January 31, 1977. He was the unsuccessful Republican nominee for the United States Senate in 1978, losing to Democratic nominee and then-Governor David Boren.

Education
Born in West Union, Iowa, Kamm graduated from the University of Northern Iowa in 1940 with a bachelor's degree in English and theater arts. He later attended the University of Minnesota to receive his master's in 1946 and Ph.D. in 1948, both in counseling and higher education.

Employment
As a U.S. Navy serviceman, Kamm worked at Oklahoma A&M College for three months as part of a radar study. He then moved to Drake University, where he served as dean of students, and later to the Agricultural and Mechanical College of Texas, where he was a student personnel dean and freshman dean.

Kamm returned to Oklahoma State in 1958 to be named the dean of the College of Arts and Sciences. He was promoted to vice president for academic affairs in 1965.

He died in Okmulgee, Oklahoma on October 10, 2008.

Awards
In 1988, Kamm received the Henry G. Bennett Distinguished Service Award for outstanding citizenship and leadership, Oklahoma State's highest honor. He was inducted into three hall of fames, including the Oklahoma Hall of Fame (1972), the Oklahoma Educators Hall of Fame (1987), and the College of Education Hall of Fame (2000).

References

1919 births
2008 deaths
University of Northern Iowa alumni
Oklahoma State University faculty
Presidents of Oklahoma State University
Oklahoma Republicans
People from West Union, Iowa
People from Okmulgee, Oklahoma
University of Minnesota College of Education and Human Development alumni
Texas A&M University faculty
Drake University faculty
20th-century American academics